The Ladies Professional Wrestling Association (LPWA) was a women's professional wrestling promotion which operated in the early 1990s (ca. 1989–1992). It was considered a successor to such women's promotions as Gorgeous Ladies of Wrestling (GLOW), but it differed in that, while GLOW slanted more toward WWF-style sports entertainment, the LPWA treated its product seriously and put its primary emphasis on in-ring athletics.

History
Thurston John "Tor" Berg (1938–2011) founded the company ca. 1989.  An incident occurred in March 1991, where Berg promised Jumping Bomb Angels member Noriyo Tateno that he would give her a permanent job in the new company if she retired in Japan and moved to the United States. Berg, however, later backed out on the deal, and Sherri Martel made the incident public.

The LPWA produced two television series, The Super Ladies of Wrestling and Ladies Championship Wrestling from 1990 to 1992. Many of their matches were also distributed and sold on VHS tapes. They held their first and only pay-per-view, Super Ladies Showdown, on February 23, 1992 before closing down operations shortly after.

Berg planned on promoting a second Super Ladies pay-per-view event in 2000, but the event was canceled. The pay-per-view was scheduled to feature women from around the world, including American wrestlers Debbie Malenko, Sherri Martel, Sweet Destiny and Missy Hyatt; Japanese wrestlers Chikako Shiratori, AKINO, Chapparita Asari and Ayako Hamada; and Australian wrestlers Amy Action, Raya Riot, and former LPWA Champion Susan Sexton.

Super Ladies Showdown

LPWA Super Ladies Showdown was a professional wrestling pay-per-view from the LPWA. It took place on February 23, 1992 from the Mayo Civic Center in Rochester, Minnesota. It was the only PPV from the LPWA, which folded shortly after the event. The main event was a match for the LPWA Singles Championship, in which Terri Powers faced Lady X. The event also featured a tournament for the LPWA Japanese Championship.

Results

Championships

LPWA Championship
The LPWA Championship was a professional wrestling title created in early 1990.

LPWA Japanese Championship 
The LPWA Japanese Championship was a professional wrestling title created in 1992. The inaugural (and only) champion was Harley Saito, who won an eight-woman tournament held during the Super Ladies Showdown pay-per-view event.

Inaugural championship tournament (1992)

LPWA Tag Team Championship
The LPWA Tag Team Championship was a professional wrestling tag team title created in early 1990.

LPWA Mixed Tag Team Championship
The LPWA Tag Team Championship was an existing professional wrestling tag team title recognized in early-mid 1990. In 1973, Adrian Street and Miss Linda won the World Mixed Tag Team Championship by defeating Don Kovaks and Suzie Parker in Germany. Street and Linda were still undefeated as champions when they joined the LPWA in 1990 and continued to defend the championships in the promotion.

Alumni

Wrestlers

Female wrestlers

Allison Royal
Alona Star
Alma Alvarez
Babyface Nellie
Bad Girl
Bambi
The Beast
Black Venus
Brandy Wine
Brittany Brown
Candi Devine
Cheryl Day
Cheryl Rusa
Comrade Orga Stalinska
Dawn Marie
Dangerous Debbie T Wild
Denise Storm
Desiree Petersen
Despina Montagas
Diane Von Hoffman
Eagle Sawai
Flame
Harley Saito
Heidi Lee Morgan
Judy Martin
Kimmie Kozak
La Gata
Lady Lilith
Lady X
Leilani Kai
Lisa Starr
Madusa Miceli
Magnificent Mimi
Malia Hosaka
Mami Kitamura
Midori Saito
Miki Handa
Miss Linda
Misty Blue Simmes
Mizuki Endoh
Nasty Kat
Nasty Linda
Reggie Bennett
Rockin' Robin
Rusty "The Fox" Thomas
Samantha Pain
Shelly Francis
Shinobu Kandori
Sindy Paradise
Susan Green
Susan Sexton
Sweet Georgia Brown
Terri Power
Tina Moretti
Wendi Richter
Yukari Osawa

Male wrestlers
Adrian Street
Barry Horowitz
Tim Horner

Tag Teams
Bambi and Malia Hosaka
Bad Black and Beautiful
The Glamour Girls (The Queen's Court)
Locomotion
The Mighty Mites
The Nasty Girls
New Team America
Rockin' Robin and Wendi Richter
Team America

Mixed Tag Teams
Adnan Al-Kaissie and Sheba
Adrian Street and Miss Linda
Barry Horowitz and Lisa Starr
Tim Horner and Malia Hosaka

Other on-air talent
Commissioner
Wally Karbo

Managers
Adnan Al-Kaissie
Ashley Kennedy
Boogaloo Brown
Jonathan Blue
Norman
"Queen" Christopher Love

Announcers
Jim Cornette
Joe Pedicino
Ken Resnik
Nick Bockwinkel
Sgt. Slaughter

Interviewer
Boni Blackstone

References

Further reading
Galloway, Paul. "Sexy Sindy's Unlikely Hold on Female Wrestlingdom".  Washington Post.  6 May 1990
Rowh, Mark and William Ray Heitzmann. Careers for Sports Nuts & Other Athletic Types. Chicago: McGraw-Hill Professional, 1997.

External links

Independent professional wrestling promotions based in the Southwestern United States
Women's professional wrestling promotions